Ennordres is a commune in the Cher department in the Centre-Val de Loire region of France.

Geography

Population

Places of interest
 The church of St. Martin, dating from the thirteenth century.
 The chateau of L'Echeneau, dating from the seventeenth century.
 The chateau of La Motte, dating from the eighteenth century.

See also
Communes of the Cher department

References

Communes of Cher (department)